ISM or Ism may refer to:

Arts and entertainment
 Incredible Shrinking Man, a film
 ISM (album), a 2012 album by Norwegian electronic music producer Savant
 Ism (film), a 2016 Indian Telugu-language action film starring Nandamuri Kalyan Ram
 Ism (band), an East Coast-based alternative rock quartet

Organizations
 Institute for Supply Management, with headquarters in Arizona, US
 International Sports Management, English sports management company
 International Spy Museum, Washington, D.C., US
 Independent Society of Musicians, (formerly Incorporated Society of Musicians)  United Kingdom professional body
 Independent Sacramental Movement, section of Christianity
 International Society for Micropiles, concerned with micropile building techniques
 ISM Canada, an information technology service company based in Regina, Saskatchewan
 ISM Racing, a former autoracing team owned by Bob Hancher

Politics
 International Socialist Movement, Scotland
 International Solidarity Movement, organization focused on assisting the Palestinian cause in the Israeli-Palestinian conflict
 Italian Social Movement, a former neo-fascist and post-fascist political party in Italy

Education
 Indian School of Mines, a Deemed University under the Section 3 of University Grants Commission Act, 1956
 Indian School, Muscat, a Central Board of Secondary Education-affiliated school in Oman
 International School of Management (Paris), an American graduate institution based in Paris and New York City
 ISM University of Management and Economics, an institution of management education based in Lithuania
 International School of Myanmar
 International School Moshi, Tanzania
 Illinois State Museum, US
 The International School of Minnesota, US, a private preparatory school

Science and technology
 ISM band, the industrial, scientific and medical radio bands
 Idiopathic sclerosing mesenteritis, disease of the small intestine
 Interstellar medium, in astronomy
 Implicit Shape Model, technique in computer vision
 InterSystems MUMPS, medical computer system
 .ism, a filename extension for InstallShield MSI projects

Other uses
 Ism (name), the Arabic word for a personal name
 -ism, a suffix appended to many philosophical concepts
 Industry Structure Model, a formal model for skills and training, now superseded by SFIAPlus
 International Safety Management Code, used in shipping
 Kissimmee Gateway Airport (IATA airport code)
 Ian Standish Monteith Hamilton (1853–1947), British general
 Imperial Service Medal, decoration affiliated with the British Imperial Service Order
 Internationale Süßwarenmesse, confectionery fair held annually at Cologne trade fair
 International student ministry

See also
 ISMS (disambiguation)
 Inner Sydney Montessori School, Australia